Keswick is a neighbourhood in southwest Edmonton, Alberta, Canada that was established in 2010 through the adoption of the Keswick Neighbourhood Structure Plan (NSP). It is a planned neighborhood, which is a joint venture between MLC Group and Cameron Communities. The neighborhood was inspired by the Lake District in England and features parks, constructed wetlands and expansive walking trails.

Keswick is located within the Windermere area and was originally considered Neighbourhood 3 within Windermere Area Structure Plan (ASP). 

It is bounded by the North Saskatchewan River to the west, the future realignment of Ellerslie Road SW to the north, 170 Street SW to the east, and the future 25 Avenue SW to the south. The Windermere neighbourhood is located to the north, while future Windermere Neighbourhood 4 and Neighbourhood 5 are located to the east and south respectively.

The community is represented by the Greater Windermere Community League.

Surrounding neighbourhoods 
Keswick is bordered by the Windermere, Ambleside and  Glenridding Heights neighborhoods.

See also 
 Edmonton Federation of Community Leagues

References 

Neighbourhoods in Edmonton